The All-PLK Team is an annual honour for the five best players of a given Polish Basketball League (PLK) regular season. The team is voted by press reporters from around the country.

Teams

The player in bold was named the PLK Most Valuable Player of the given season.

References

External links
Polska Liga Koszykówki - Official Site 
Polish League at Eurobasket.com

First Team